Sematan (also known as Simatan) is a small town settlement in Lundu District, Sarawak, Malaysia.

Sematan is a fishing village looking out over the South China Sea. It has reasonably clean beaches, a promenade along the waterfront and a concrete pier into the sea. At the north end, there is a park celebrating early Malay fishermen in the Sematan area. Accommodation in Sematan can be had at the Sematan Hotel.

Local bus

Climate
Sematan has a tropical rainforest climate (Af) with heavy to very heavy rainfall year-round and with extremely heavy rainfall in January and February.

References

Lundu District
Villages in Sarawak